Grønland is a rapid transit station on the Oslo Metro in the Common Tunnel serving all six lines. It is located in the business and residential area Grønland, between the stations Jernbanetorget to the west and Tøyen to the east. The station was opened on 22 May 1966 with the opening of the subway, and underwent refurbishments 1988–92. Peer Qvam was the original architect.

In terms of passenger volume, Grønland is one of the smaller stations in the Common Tunnel. Although the area surrounding the station is close to the city centre, it is largely residential. The station has a small shopping centre adjacent to the ticket hall underground, and there is a greater number of shops still on the surface level. There are no direct connections between the subway and other modes of public transportation at Grønland, but the central coach station and a tramway stop are located a few minutes walk from the station.

The subway schedule recommends that passengers use Grønland as a transfer point between different lines because its platforms are less crowded than its neighbouring stations. The platform walls consist of white tiling, making it unequivocally the brightest subway station of the entire subway system, and its lower patronage makes it less crowded than other stations in the Common Tunnel.

History
In 1987, the station underwent work to fix leaks. This was caused by cracks in the bedrock which allowed surface water to run down into the station, and was fixed by spraying a clogging chemical into the rocks. The station underwent a major renovation, starting on 1 February 1989, which included the entrance, passenger hallways and platform area. This involved replacing all fire hazards with flammable materials, including replacing vinyl sidings with tiles, making the area brighter and installing artwork made by Terje Roalkvam. The opening took place in November 1989 after investments of 11 million Norwegian kroner (NOK). The renovations were completed with only a single day of the station being closed to travelers.

When the hotel Oslo Plaza opened, there was noise pollution from the metro to the hotel's reception. To elude this, the metro installed a  rubber mat under the track and ballast between Grønland and Stortinget during February 1990. After having been closed for several years, the public toilet at Grønland reopened in May 1990, after the operation had been privatized, in an agreement where a private enterprise was allowed to sell flowers and collect money from users in exchange for covering the operation expenses. On 11 October 1998, a bridge was opened allowing direct access to Oslo Bus Terminal. The investment cost NOK 6 million.

Service
The station is located in the Common Tunnel, and therefore served by all six lines of the Oslo Metro. Each of the lines runs once or twice every 15 minutes, except at late evening and Saturday and Sunday morning, giving about 30 departures per hour in each direction during regular hours. Travel time to Stortinget is 2 minutes, while travel time to the eastern terminal stations is 10 minutes to Nydalen, 25 minutes to Vestli, 21 minutes to Bergkrystallen, 23 minutes to Mortensrud and 21 minutes to Ellingsrudåsen.

Grønland is within walking distance of Oslo Bus Terminal, which serves regional and intercity coaches. Grønland is also within walking distance of the station Bussterminalen Grønland on the Gamleby Line of the Oslo Tramway.

References

External links

Oslo Metro stations in Oslo
Railway stations opened in 1966
1966 establishments in Norway